HMS Blankney was a  of the Royal Navy and was the first and so far only warship to bear the Name. She was laid down on 17 May 1940 at John Brown & Company, Clydebank, Scotland, launched on 19 December 1940 and commissioned on 11 April 1941.

Blankney was one of 33, Type II Hunt Escort Destroyers. The hulls of this second batch had an extra section which with the increased beam, gave stability for a third twin 4" AA gun to be mounted as originally designed and additional storage for depth charges (increased from 40 to 110). The class were named after fox hunts located in different parts of Britain and in Blankney's case, this was the Blankney Hunt, a fox-hunting pack based in the North Kesteven district of Lincolnshire.

In 1942 the British Wartime Government introduced a National Savings campaign named "Warship Week" where towns could "adopt" a Royal Navy ship. Blankney was adopted by Nantwich in Cheshire. The town still has two roads named after the destroyer, Blankney Avenue and The Blankney. There is a plaque hanging in Civic Hall, commemorating the towns support for the crew.

Service history

12th escort group
From October 1941 Blankney was a member of the 12th escort group based at Derry, Northern Ireland. In December she was dispatched  to reinforce Commander Johnny Walker's U-boat killer group that was escorting convoy HG 76 for passage to Gibraltar.

On 17 December 1942, the German submarine  was spotted on the surface by a Martlet of 802 NAS  flying from the escort carrier  and was forced to dive.  After being damaged in a depth charge attack by the corvette , U-131 tried to escape on the surface. The Martlet strafed the boat, but was shot down in the process.

Realizing that the situation was hopeless, the crew scuttled the submarine. All 47 of the crew survived and were taken prisoner.

On 18 December, Stanley spotted  on the surface and gave chase. As the submarine dived, Blankney achieved firm ASDIC (sonar) contact and made three depth charge attacks.  U-434 was severely damaged, but managed to surface and allow her crew escape before sinking. Blankney rescued the crew before returning to Gibraltar to refuel.

Arctic convoys
At the start of 1942 Blankney was under repair at Gibraltar, she left Gibraltar on 23 June 1942 for the UK, before becoming part of the escort for Arctic convoy WS 16. Later she provided Distant Cover for Russian Convoy PQ 17 and the return Convoy QP 13 from Murmansk to Iceland.  In July 1942 Blankney was damaged in a collision and spent three months in Northern Russia under repair, before sailing from  Archangel as part of the escort of convoy QP 14.

Blankney spent the rest of the year under repair at Loch Ewe with a secondary role to provide  a local escort for Convoy JW 51B

Operations in the Mediterranean
During Operation Husky. Blankney was able to provide air defence and shore bombardment at the Bark East Landing area with fellow destroyer, .

On 10 March 1944 Blankney, Exmoor and the US destroyer , sank  in the western Mediterranean South of Ostia, at position , in a co-ordinated depth charge attack.  All 42 crew members of the submarine were rescued and became prisoners of war.

On the night of 2 May 1944,  was spotted when she surfaced almost in the middle of the convoy off Djidjelli on the Algerian coast and immediately crash-dived. U-371 fired a torpedo, then dived. Menges was hit and the aft third of the vessel destroyed, but she remained afloat.

This called for the location of a known U-boat to be packed with escort ships and aircraft, to systematically search the area, forcing the U-boat to remain submerged until its batteries or air ran out and was forced to surface.

Blankney and the other escorts spotted the submarine and immediately opened fire, scoring several hits. The U-boat returned fire, and managed to hit Sénégalais with a torpedo, causing some damage. The situation for U-371 was hopeless as she was unable to dive and faced massively superior firepower from the attacking destroyers. Most of her crew jumped overboard and were taken prisoner.

D-Day, 6 June 1944
During Operation Neptune Blankney was a member of  Force K Gunfire Support Bombarding, assigned to "Gold Beach" during operation the Allied landings in Normandy.

End of the War

Following Operation Neptune, Blankney was deployed in and around the English Channel and the North Sea to guard against any attempts for E-Boats or U-boats laying naval mines in the Thames estuary. Her war was completed when in August 1945, following VJ Day she returned to the UK where she was laid up in Sheerness as part of the Reserve Fleet.

Fate
Blankney was refited after VJ Day and returned to UK. In May 1946 she was paid off and entered Reserve at Devonport. The ship had another refit in 1948 and was then laid up in Reserve Fleet at Sheerness. During 1952 she was moved to Hartlepool and approval was given for her to be placed on the Disposal List on 22 October 1958. She was sold to BISCO for scrapping by Hughes Bolckow at Blyth and was towed to the breaker's yard 9 March the same year.  Her badge can still be seen painted on the side of the Selborne dry dock wall at Simonstown, South Africa.

Royal Mail Stamp
On 7 September 1989 a 22p stamp featuring the Ships Badge was issued (SG616)

Notes

Publications
 Colledge, J. J. & Warlow, Ben: Ships of the Royal Navy - The Complete Record of all Fighting Ships of the Royal Navy from the 15th Century to the Present. Newbury, UK: Casemate, 2010. 
 English, John: The Hunts - A history of the design, development and careers of the 86 destroyers of this class built for the Royal and Allied Navies during World War II. Cumbria: World Ship Society, 1987. 
 Gardiner, Robert: Conway's All the World's Fighting Ships 1922–1946: Conway Maritime Press, 1987. 
 
 Whitley, M. J.: Destroyers of World War Two – an international encyclopedia: Arms and Armour, 1988.

External links
 The Hunt (Type II) class Escort destroyers
 Blankney at Sea Metheringham Area News

 

Hunt-class destroyers of the Royal Navy
Ships built on the River Clyde
1940 ships
World War II destroyers of the United Kingdom
Royal Navy ship names